Andrés Arturo Mack (sometimes nicknamed Colorado - "Red hair" in Spanish) (Canberra, 12 November 1876 – Vicente López, 6 October 1936) was an Australian born (then naturalized Argentine) footballer who played as midfielder. Mack spent his entire career with Alumni (where he won 20 titles) and the Argentina national team.

Biography
Mack arrived to Argentina in 1894 after graduating in Bachelor of Arts at the University of Cambridge. He primarily worked as teacher of both disciplines, mathematics and sports, at the Buenos Aires English High School, the institution founded and directed by Argentine football pioneer Alexander Watson Hutton.

Apart from teaching at the School, Mack played for legendary team Alumni since 1900 until its dissolution in 1911. He also played for the Argentina national team in the first match ever recorded against Uruguay on 16 May 1901.

In 1914 Mack returned Europe while the World War I was happening. He joined Royal Army Medical Corps but he had to abandon the activity after being injured in battle. Mack returned to Buenos Aires, where he continued teaching until his death.

Titles
(All of them won with Alumni):

National
 Argentine Primera División (9): 1900, 1902, 1903, 1905, 1906, 1907, 1909, 1910, 1911
 Copa de Competencia Jockey Club (3): 1907, 1908, 1909
 Copa de Honor Municipalidad de Buenos Aires (2): 1905, 1906

International
 Copa de Honor Cousenier (1): 1906
 Tie Cup (5): 1903, 1906, 1907, 1908, 1909

Bibliography
 Alumni, Cuna de Campeones y Escuela de Hidalguía by Ernesto Escobar Bavio, Editorial Difusión of Buenos Aires (1953)

Argentina international footballers
Argentine footballers
Argentine people of Australian descent
Australian soccer players
Association football midfielders
1876 births
1936 deaths
Sportspeople from Canberra
Soccer players from the Australian Capital Territory
Alumni of the University of Cambridge
Alumni Athletic Club players
Argentine Primera División players
Naturalized citizens of Argentina
Australian emigrants to Argentina
British Army personnel of World War I
Royal Army Medical Corps soldiers